Cypa bouyeri is a species of moth of the family Sphingidae. It is known from Sulawesi.

References

Cypa
Moths described in 1998